Oriental Wrestling Entertainment (OWE) is a Chinese-based professional wrestling promotion founded in 2017. OWE shows normally combine wrestling with musical performances by the C-pop all-girls group SNH48.
The promotion currently promotes one championship as part of their events. OWE has working relationships with the U.S.-based All Elite Wrestling (AEW), Future Stars of Wrestling, and Mexican The Crash Lucha Libre promotions.

History
While the concept of professional wrestling has been well established in Europe and North America since the 19th century, and in Japan since the end of World War II, China had no exposure to professional wrestling prior to the turn of the millennium. The first Chinese professional wrestling promotion, China Wrestling Entertainment, was created in 2004, promoting traditional professional wrestling events, but struggled to stay profitable. In 2017, Chinese film director Fu Huayang created Oriental Wrestling Entertainment, based out of Shanghai, starting a talent search amongst over 200,000 applicants that all had a martial arts background, selecting a group of 50 people to be trained for professional wrestling.

In early 2018, OWE started a working relationship with Dragon Gate, featuring trainees from OWE working at Dragon Gate events and Dragon Gate main-stay Cima training them, helping OWE to promote its first official show, "The Legend of the Dragon" held on February 2, in Shanghai, featuring the Dragon Gate wrestlers and OWE's roster. On May 7,  Cima announced that he, T-Hawk, El Lindaman and Takehiro Yamamura were all leaving Dragon Gate, relocating from Japan to China to be involved with OWE. Cima was announced as the head coach and the President for OWE and began training the rookies.

OWE later began a partnership with Las Vegas, Nevada based Future Stars of Wrestling, sending CIMA and three trainees to FSW shows as well as several members of the FSW roster traveling to China. Cima and several OWE students also appeared for other promotions, such as the Australasian Wrestling Federation (AWF), Wrestle-1, and  DDT Pro-Wrestling shows.
 
On January 8, 2019 the newly created All Elite Wrestling (AEW) U.S.-based promotion announced that they had reached a partnership agreement with Oriental Wrestling Entertainment that would include OWE wrestlers working for AEW and vice versa. In January 2019,  Mexican based The Crash Lucha Libre promotion announced that they had reached a deal with OWE to collaborate on wrestling events in the future. On March 26, OWE signed a video-on-demand television deal with Nothing Else On TV to distribute their content in the United Kingdom and Worldwide, becoming the first "Sino-British" wrestling agreement in professional wrestling. On March 31, OWE announced their first active championship, the Dragon's Legend Championship, with the inaugural champion to be crowned during the promotion's OWE First Time Japan shows in Osaka and Tokyo on April 18 and 20, while also becoming the first Chinese professional wrestling promotion to promote a show in Japan, which both sold out. The first night of the show was broadcast by Japanese television network Fighting TV Samurai and featured wrestlers from Wrestle-1, whom OWE as a working relationship. On April 23, OWE announced a television deal with Jiangsu Television, which would see the company's programming brought to one billion Chinese viewers.

On June 26, 2019 OWE announced a plan to expand their product in the United Kingdom in September, while also announcing the establish of UK-based brand and new titles. The plans would be due to disagreements between OWE and NEO TV owner Sean McMahon, while also claiming that OWE made broken promises and made misconduct towards him with OWE later offering refunds to attendees of the tour.

Style and cultural influences
Oriental Wrestling Entertainment presents shows and in-ring performances to the culture of mainland China, adjusting the professional wrestling concept to their audience. Chinese wrestler Ho Ho Lun described the difference between OWE and other companies who have promoted wrestling as "OWE is putting wrestling into Kung Fu, whereas people such as The Slam have strived to put Kung Fu into wrestling". Most of OWE's Chinese roster have a martial arts, especially Shaolin Kung Fu, background with the style and concepts of the martial arts influencing the in-ring product and presentation.

Part of OWE's presentation focuses on educating spectators on the details of professional wrestling, such as videos prior to matches explaining that matches can be won by a 3-fall pinfall. During events the commentary is broadcast over the public address system in the arena, helping guide the fans on whom to cheer for and so on. In Asian culture it is generally considered disrespectful for people to be loud or boo, which in turn leads to the fans either remaining quiet and politely clapping during matches, or generally cheering the action without booing any of the in-ring competitors. Most of the heels (the "bad guys") have been foreigners. OWE shows have been described as variety shows, combining martial arts exhibits by the OWE roster, musical performances from C-pop acts such as SNH48 and wrestling matches.

Another aspect of their presentation is the impact of the Chinese government rules and standards for entertainment events. OWE Vice President Michael Nee explained that "Typical wrestling can be a little too violent. If we try to copy the Japanese way and put that into the Chinese market, our product will be killed by the government". As a result of the cultural restrictions and in an effort to present a more "Chinese" product OWE focuses on the culture of Chinese martial arts and spreading awareness on a global scale, presenting wrestling angles, storylines and in ring characters very differently and more sedate compared to western companies such as WWE.

Due to this, governmental control and censorship of the Communist Party of China in addition to increasing economic issues in the marketplace and uncertainty facing the country, in late 2019 it was reported that the promotion would cease all operations in China, leave the country and relaunch and incorporate in Cambodia.

OWE Openweight Championship

Broadcasters
Domestic:
 Jiangsu Television (2019–present, currently broadcasting weekly highlights show Baichang Daren)
International:
 Fighting TV Samurai (2019–present, Japan, dubbed with Japanese commentary)
Worldwide:
 Nothing Else On TV (2019, online linear television service, live-streaming episodes)
 FITE TV (2020–present, internet streaming service, live-streaming episodes)

Roster

OWE has a permanent roster of 35 Chinese wrestlers who are all under a 10-year contract and are provided training facilities and accommodations in the same vein as C-pop groups backed by record labels. OWE also has four Japanese wrestlers under full-time contracts and usually brings in foreign wrestlers on a show-by-show basis.
Male roster

Female

Backstage personnel

Footnotes

References

External links 

2017 establishments in China
Entertainment companies established in 2017
Companies based in Shanghai
Organizations established in 2017
Professional wrestling promotions
Professional wrestling in China